The Project 206FM class (NATO reporting name: "Krogulec"-class), originally designated Project 206F, were mine-countermeasure vessels of the Polish Navy built during the mid-1960s.

Class history
The twelve ships of this class were built at the Komuny Paryskiej Shipyard in Gdynia as coastal minesweepers Project 206F class, and served as the 9th Coastal Defence Flotilla at Hel. Most of the class were decommissioned by the early 1990s, though three were modernised around 2000, and remain in service as minehunters (their designation was changed to Project 206FM for Modernized). Last ship war retired from service on 8 December 2021.

Ships
The 12 ships in the class were:

References

Cold War mine warfare vessels of Poland
Minehunters
Mine warfare vessels of the Polish Navy
Polish inventions